China Aluminum International Engineering  (also known as Chalieco) is a Chinese engineering firm in businesses including engineering design and consultancy, engineering and construction contracting and equipment manufacturing.  As a contractor it is the 124th largest construction firm in the world as ranked by Engineering News-Record in 2013.

It operates as a subsidiary of the Aluminum Corporation of China (Chinalco), which holds 83% of the shareholding of the company.  The company premièred on the Hong Kong Stock Exchange with a 2012 IPO that listed 15% of the shares on the exchange. 

The company has invested heavily in operations in Vietnam and Venezuela.

References

Construction and civil engineering companies of China
Companies based in Beijing
Companies listed on the Hong Kong Stock Exchange